Favites abdita, also known as the larger star coral, is a species of stony coral in the family Merulinidae. It is native to the Indo-Pacific region and its range extends from East Africa and the Red Sea through the Indian Ocean to the Western Pacific Ocean. The International Union for Conservation of Nature has rated its conservation status as being "near-threatened".

Description
Favites abdita is a massive colonial coral forming rounded irregular mounds. The septa are straight with well-developed teeth. Various colours occur, ranging from reddish brown to greyish green, and the oral discs are usually green.

Distribution
Favites abdita is native to the Indo-Pacific region where it occurs in shallow tropical and subtropical seas. Its range extends from the Red Sea and South Africa to India, Indonesia, Japan, Australia and the Central Pacific island groups. It is also found at greater depths on coral rubble between reefs.

Status
Favites abdita is a common species and has a wide range and is likely to be more resilient than some other coral species. There is no precise information on population trends but this coral faces the same threats as other species; global warming, ocean acidification and degradation of its coral reef habitats. It is collected for the reef aquarium trade. The International Union for Conservation of Nature has assessed its conservation status as being "near-threatened".

References 

Merulinidae
Corals described in 1786